Allogamasellus is a genus of mites in the family Ologamasidae. There are at least two described species in Allogamasellus.

Species
These two species belong to the genus Allogamasellus:
 Allogamasellus aquafortensis Athias-Henriot, 1961
 Allogamasellus squalidus Athias-Henriot, 1961

References

Ologamasidae
Articles created by Qbugbot